Al Wright may refer to:
Al Wright (baseball manager) (1842–1905), American manager of the Philadelphia Athletics
Al Wright (second baseman) (Albert Wright, 1912–1998), American Major League Baseball second baseman
Al G. Wright (1916–2020), American band director at Purdue University

See also
Albert Wright (disambiguation)
Alan Wright (disambiguation)
Alexander Wright (disambiguation)